Denisa Allertová was the defending champion, but lost to Vitalia Diatchenko in the first round.

Maryna Zanevska won the title, defeating Marta Kostyuk in the final, 6–2, 6–4.

Seeds

Draw

Finals

Top half

Bottom half

References
Main Draw

Zhuhai Open - Singles
2018 Women's Singles